Ojanperä is a Finnish surname. Notable people with the surname include:

Abraham Ojanperä (1856–1916), Finnish singer
Antti Ojanperä (born 1983), Finnish footballer
Olavi Ojanperä (1921–2016), Finnish sprint canoeist

Finnish-language surnames